Fiocco is an Italian surname, and may refer to:
Pietro Antonio Fiocco, Italian baroque composer
Giorgio Fiocco, Atmospheric physicist
Joseph-Hector Fiocco, Belgian baroque composer, Pietro's son
Jean-Joseph Fiocco, Flemish organist and baroque composer, Pietro's son
Fiocco (band), a Belgian dance act